The New England Patriots are a professional American football team based in the Greater Boston metropolitan area. They are a member of the American Football Conference East Division (AFC East). The team began as the Boston Patriots in the American Football League, which merged with the National Football League in 1970. In 1971, the team relocated to Foxborough, where they became the New England Patriots. Since its establishment in 1960, the franchise has selected 65 players in the first round, five of these being the first overall pick.

The NFL Draft, which is officially known as the "Player Selection Meeting", is held each April. The draft is used as the primary means to distribute newly available talent (primarily from college football) equitably amongst the teams. Selections are made in reverse order based on the previous season's record, i.e., the club with the worst record from the previous season selects first. Through 2009, only two exceptions were made to this order: the Super Bowl champion always selects last (32nd), and the Super Bowl loser second to last (31st). Beginning in 2010, teams making the playoffs have been seeded in reverse order depending upon how far they advance. The draft consists of seven rounds. Teams have the option of trading selections for players, cash and/or other selections (including future year selections). Thus, it is not uncommon for a team's actual draft pick to differ from their assigned draft pick, or for a team to have extra or no draft picks in any round due to these trades. The Patriots traded their first-round pick six times (1972, 1974, 2000, 2009, 2013, and 2017). In 2016, their first-round pick was stripped as punishment for the Deflategate incident.

Ron Burton, a running back from Northwestern, was the first player to be drafted to the Patriots team. He was selected third overall in the 1960 American Football League Draft. Jim Plunkett, a quarterback from Stanford, was the Patriots' first selection in the 1971 NFL Draft. The Patriots have selected first overall five times, drafting Jack Concannon in 1964, Plunkett in 1971, Kenneth Sims in 1982, Irving Fryar in 1984, and Drew Bledsoe in 1993. The team has selected third overall once and fourth overall three times. Through 2017, two Patriots first-round draft picks have been elected to the Pro Football Hall of Fame: John Hannah and Mike Haynes. Twenty Patriots first-round draft picks have been selected for the Pro Bowl. The team's most recent first-round draft pick was Cole Strange, a guard from Chattanooga.

Key

Player selections

Notes

 Drafted by the Minnesota Vikings of the NFL; did not stay with the Patriots
 Drafted by the Cleveland Browns of the NFL; did not stay with the Patriots
 Also drafted by the Cleveland Browns of the NFL; stayed with the Patriots
 Drafted by the Philadelphia Eagles of the NFL; did not stay with the Patriots
 Drafted by the Detroit Lions of the NFL; did not stay with the Patriots
 The Patriots traded their #17 overall pick to the Los Angeles Rams.
 Acquired from the Los Angeles Rams.
 Acquired from the Chicago Bears.
 The Patriots traded their #9 overall pick to the San Francisco 49ers.
 Acquired from the San Francisco 49ers.
 Acquired from the Houston Oilers.
 Acquired from the San Francisco 49ers.
 Acquired from the Houston Oilers.
 Acquired from the San Francisco 49ers.
 Acquired from the Tampa Bay Buccaneers.
 Acquired from the San Francisco 49ers.
 Acquired from the Seattle Seahawks.
 Acquired from the Indianapolis Colts through the Seattle Seahawks.
 Acquired from the Minnesota Vikings through the Dallas Cowboys.
 Acquired from the New Orleans Saints through the Dallas Cowboys.
 Acquired from the Minnesota Vikings through the Dallas Cowboys 
 Acquired from the New York Jets in compensation for losing restricted free agent Curtis Martin.
 Acquired from the Seattle Seahawks.
 Acquired from the New York Jets in compensation for losing Bill Parcells.
 The Patriots forfeited their #16 overall pick to the Jets in compensation for hiring Bill Belichick.
 Acquired from the Tampa Bay Buccaneers through the Oakland Raiders and Washington Redskins.
 Acquired from the Washington Redskins through the New York Jets and Chicago Bears.
 Acquired from the Baltimore Ravens.
 Acquired from the Seattle Seahawks.
 Acquired from the New Orleans Saints.
 The Patriots traded their #23 overall pick to the Baltimore Ravens.
 Acquired from the Dallas Cowboys.
 The Patriots traded their #29 overall pick to the Minnesota Vikings.
 The Patriots had their 1st-round pick stripped as punishment for the Deflategate incident.
 The Patriots traded their #32 overall pick to the New Orleans Saints.
The Patriots traded their #23 overall pick to the Los Angeles Chargers.

References

General

Specific

New England Patriots

 
first-round draft picks